The Two of Us is an ITV comedy series starring Nicholas Lyndhurst and Janet Dibley.

Overview
The series focused on Ashley and Elaine, an unmarried couple living together, at a time when this was becoming increasingly common in Britain, but still considered slightly controversial in some circles. It was produced by LWT.

While Ashley was keen for the pair to get married and would regularly propose, Elaine saw no reason to get married and was happy to keep her independence. Ashley's roguish grandfather Perce (played by Patrick Troughton, but later by Tenniel Evans after Troughton's death) was supportive of the couple, but Ashley's domineering mother (Jennifer Piercey) disapproved and constantly urged the pair to marry. Ashley's suppressed father (Paul McDowell) seemed less upset, but generally backed up his wife in the hope of a quiet life and the odd sherry.

After initially deciding to get married in the 1988 Christmas special, only to skip the wedding when their flight time for the honeymoon was brought forward, Ashley and Elaine finally married in the fourth series, with the pair focusing on their plans to start a family. In the final episode Elaine takes a pregnancy test, but the result is never revealed.

Two regional remakes were made of the series. In Germany, 41 episodes of Unter einer Decke (± Under one Roof) were produced in 1993/94, using most of the scripts from the original series, combined with new scripts from Germany and the Netherlands. The Dutch version Vrienden voor het leven (Friends for Life) had 65 episodes produced in 1990-95 of which 64 have been released on DVD in the Netherlands.

Cast
Nicholas Lyndhurst as Ashley Phillips
Janet Dibley as Elaine Walker
Patrick Troughton as Perce (Series 1)
Tenniel Evans as Perce (Series 2–4)
Paul McDowell as Mr Colin Phillips
Jennifer Piercey as Mrs Lilian Phillips
Francesca Hall as Karen

Episodes

Series 1 (1986)

Series 2 (1987)

Christmas Special (1988)

Series 3 (1989)

Series 4 (1990)

Home releases

References

External links

The Two of Us at the Phill.co.uk Comedy Guide

1986 British television series debuts
1990 British television series endings
1980s British sitcoms
1980s British romantic comedy television series
1990s British sitcoms
1990s British romantic comedy television series
English-language television shows
ITV sitcoms
London Weekend Television shows
Television series about couples
Television series by ITV Studios